Charles Edward Hungerford Atholl Colston, 1st Baron Roundway   (16 May 1854 – 17 June 1925) was a British Conservative Party politician. He sat in the House of Commons from 1892 to 1906, and was later elevated to the peerage, taking his seat in the House of Lords.

Early life and family 
Colston was the son of Edward Colston, of Roundway Park near Devizes, Wiltshire, and his wife Louisa, daughter of Rev. Edward Murray from Northolt in Middlesex.

in 1879 he married Rosalind Emma Gostling-Murray, daughter of Col. Charles Gostling-Murray of Hounslow.

Career 
He was educated at Eton College and at Christ Church, Oxford, where he graduated in 1876 with a Bachelor of Arts (BA) degree.

He was High Sheriff of Wiltshire in 1885, and became a Deputy Lieutenant of Wiltshire in the same year. He was also a Justice of the Peace for Wiltshire.

At the 1885 general election he stood unsuccessfully in Bristol North. He was elected at the 1892 general election as the Member of Parliament (MP) for Thornbury, and held the seat until his defeat at the 1906 general election by the Liberal candidate Athelstan Rendall.

He was elevated to the peerage in the 1916 Birthday Honours, as Baron Roundway of Devizes.

References

External links 
 

1854 births
1925 deaths
Conservative Party (UK) MPs for English constituencies
UK MPs 1892–1895
UK MPs 1895–1900
UK MPs 1900–1906
UK MPs who were granted peerages
Barons in the Peerage of the United Kingdom
People educated at Eton College
Alumni of Christ Church, Oxford
High Sheriffs of Wiltshire
Deputy Lieutenants of Wiltshire
Conservative Party (UK) hereditary peers
Barons created by George V